Uroplectes lineatus is a species of scorpion, endemic to the Western Cape of South Africa. U. lineatus is noted for is a clinically important venom.

References

External links
 Image of U. lineatus
 Image of female with young

Buthidae
Animals described in 1844
Endemic fauna of South Africa
Scorpions of Africa